Logical model can refer to:

 A model in logic, see model theory
 In computer science a logical data model